Maningning Miclat (April 15, 1972 – September 29, 2000) was a Filipina poet and painter born in China to Filipino parents. She was known for her Chinese bamboo Zen paintings as well as her poetry.

Biography
Miclat was born in Beijing, China on April 15, 1972 to Badjao parents who were then based there. She has a younger sister, Banaue, who would later become an aspiring opera singer in New York City. Her family left the Philippines in 1969 during Ferdinand Marcos' regime and moved to China in 1971. In 1986, she and her family returned to the Philippines after the People Power Revolution that saw the removal of Marcos from power. As a result of her being born in China she became fluent in three languages, namely Mandarin Chinese, Filipino, and English.

In 1987, she published her first book of poems, Wo De Shi, in Mandarin Chinese, and held her first solo show of traditional Chinese painting, Maningning: An Exhibit of Chinese Brush Works. She had four more solo shows in her lifetime.

Miclat became a Fellow of the University of the Philippines National Writers Workshop in 1990 and won an award for a Filipino play there. She also became a Fellow of the Silliman National Writers Workshop.

In 1992, she won the Art Association of the Philippines Grand Prize for a painting entitled Trouble in Paradise, and her second book of poetry, Voice from the Underworld, was a finalist in the country's 2001 National Book Award.

Miclat attended the University of the Philippines Diliman to pursue a master's degree in fine arts and then taught at the Far Eastern University.

Death and legacy
In 2000, at the age of 28, she jumped from the seventh floor of the Education Hall Building of Far Eastern University in Manila where she was teaching at the time. In 2001, the Maningning Foundation was founded in her memory to celebrate the talents of young artists both in the visual and written arts.

Poetry and publications
Maningning Miclat Poems
Wo De Shi (My Poems)
Voice from the Underworld (1987)

References

External links
Maningning Foundation

1972 births
2000 deaths
Filipino women poets
Filipino women painters
Suicides by jumping in the Philippines
20th-century Filipino poets
20th-century Filipino painters
20th-century women artists
Filipino expatriates in China
20th-century Filipino women writers
Painters who committed suicide
2000 suicides